Aeschylus Poulos is a Canadian film producer. He is most noted as a producer of the films My Tree, which was a Canadian Screen Award nominee for Best Feature Length Documentary at the 10th Canadian Screen Awards in 2022, and Brother, which was a CSA nominee for Best Motion Picture at the 11th Canadian Screen Awards in 2023.

Formerly associated with Foundry Films, where he was a producer or co-producer of films such as Inescapable, Picture Day and Molly Maxwell, he launched his own shingle, Hawkeye Pictures, in 2015 to executive produce Andrew Cividino's film Sleeping Giant. With Hawkeye, he has been a producer of 22 Chaser, Propaganda: The Art of Selling Lies and The Young Arsonists, and executive producer of Natasha, My 90-Year-Old Roommate, Mary Goes Round, Tito and The Long Rider.

References

External links

Living people
Film producers from Ontario
Canadian film production company founders
Canadian people of Greek descent